A Killing Spring is a 2002 Canadian made-for-television thriller film directed by Stephen Williams and starring Wendy Crewson, Kim Schraner. The film's plot concerns the murder of a college dean.

Cast
Wendy Crewson - Joanne Kilbourn
Shawn Doyle - Detective Alex Emanuel
Michael Ontkean - Tom Keaton
Zachery Ty Bryan - Val Massey
Sherry Miller - Lisa Gallagher
John Furey - Reed Gallagher
Bruce Gray - Ed Kramer
Kim Schraner - Kelly Savage
Kris Holden-Ried - Karl Hrynluk
Jocelyn Snowdon - Emma Chavez
Callahan Connor - Angus Kilbourn
Natasha La Force - Taylor Kilbourn
Zachary Bennett - Zack
Pamela Wallin - Herself
Jean Yoon - Officer Lau

External links

2002 television films
2002 films
2000s crime thriller films
Canadian detective films
Police detective films
Canadian thriller television films
Crime television films
Films based on crime novels
Canadian crime thriller films
English-language Canadian films
2000s Canadian films